Jelili Adebisi Omotola  (20 April 1941 – 29 March 2006) was a Nigerian  professor of Property Law, Senior Advocate of Nigeria (SAN),  educational administrator and former  vice chancellor of the University of Lagos.

Education
In 1961, he obtained his first school leaving certificate, West African School Certificate (WASC). In 1966, he received the University of London Merit Award in English Law and Criminal Law.
in 1967 he obtained his LLB at the University of London and in 1971, he achieved the Doctor of philosophy (Ph.D) degree in Law from the same university.

Life and career
He was appointed as Vice chancellor of the University of Lagos in 1995, a tenure that lasted for five years (1995-2000). Jelili is one of the law professionals that contributed significantly  to property law and the Land Use Act in Nigeria.

Selected works 
a

See also
List of vice chancellors in Nigeria
University of Lagos
Oyewusi Ibidapo Obe

References

1941 births
2006 deaths
20th-century Nigerian lawyers
Vice-Chancellors of the University of Lagos
People from Ijebu Ode
Alumni of the University of London
Officers of the Order of the Niger